Paracorus is a genus of longhorn beetles of the subfamily Lamiinae.

 Paracorus mirei Breuning, 1969
 Paracorus praecox Kolbe, 1894

References

Crossotini